Blasphemy Made Flesh is the debut album by Canadian death metal band Cryptopsy. The album was released in 1994, re-released in 1997 by Displeased Records, and also re-released in 2001 by Century Media with a different cover. It is the only album to feature bassist Martin Fergusson.

Track listing
All songs written and arranged by Cryptopsy.

Personnel

Cryptopsy
 Lord Worm – vocals
 Jon Levasseur – lead and rhythm guitars
 Steve Thibault – rhythm guitar, backing vocals
 Martin Fergusson – bass
 Flo Mounier – drums, backing vocals, photography, logo art

Additional personnel
 François Quévillon – cover art (original cover)
 Jacky Mounier – photography
 Rod "The God" Shearer – engineering
 Kevin Weagle – design

References

Cryptopsy albums
1994 debut albums
Century Media Records albums